John Walter Yanta (October 2, 1931 – August 6, 2022) was an American prelate of the Roman Catholic Church.  He served as bishop of the Diocese of Amarillo in Texas from 1997 to 2008 and as an auxiliary bishop in the Archdiocese of San Antonio in Texas from 1994 to 1997.

Biography

Early years 
On March 17, 1956, Yanta was ordained into the priesthood for the Archdiocese of San Antonio by Archbishop Robert Lucey. In 1957, Yanta was assigned as assistant pastor at St. Ann’s Parish in San Antonio.

During this period, Yanta would frequently join protests in front of a Planned Parenthood clinic in San Antonio, protesting its abortion services to women.  He was arrested during one protest for disturbing the peace. In 1981, Yanta and Father Larry Steubben founded Catholic Television of San Antonio (CTSA).

Auxiliary Bishop of San Antonio 
On December 30, 1994, Pope John Paul II appointed Yanta as an auxiliary bishop for the Archdiocese of San Antonio.  He was consecrated by Archbishop Patrick Flores at the Immaculate Conception Church in Panna Maria, Texas.

Bishop of Amarillo 
On January 21, 1997, Pope John Paul II named Yanta as the bishop of the Diocese of Amarillo.  He was installed on March 17, 1997.

On July 10, 2002, Yanta and the Diocese of Amarillo were named in a lawsuit for the rape of a teenage girl in 2000 by Rosendo Herrera, a diocese priest.  When the plaintiff was aged 17, Herrera raped and impregnated her.  The suit claimed that the diocese was aware of previous offenses by Herrera, and had failed to notify authorities as required by state law.

By September 2002, eight priests had resigned from the diocese due to sexual abuse allegations.  On February 28, 2003, Yanta agreed to a US$27,000 legal settlement with the family of the girl raped by Herrera in 2000.

Retirement 
Yanta retired on January 3, 2008.  Upon his retirement from the Diocese of Amarillo, Yanta moved to San Antonio  where he was active in socially conservative political causes. In 2011, Yanta established the Polish Heritage Center Foundation and bought land in Panna Maria to build the Polish Heritage Center, a museum about Polish immigrants to Texas. In 2021, Yanta spent a week in the hospital due to a case of pneumonia.

John Yanta died in San Antonio on August 6, 2022 at age 90.

Viewpoints

Politics 
On May 14, 2009, Yanta sent a letter of protest to Father John I. Jenkins, the president of the University of Notre Dame about the university inviting President Barack Obama to its commencement ceremony. In the letter, Yanta stated:I also see Notre Dame crucifying Our Lord once again. Our Blessed Mother must be sorrowful for what you are doing to her Son, using her name in doing so.

Sexual abuse scandal 
In 2002, Yanta criticized the "zero tolerance" policies on sexual abuse by priests that were adopted by the US Conference of Catholic Bishops in June 2002.  He argued that one-time offenders who had gone through counseling should not be punished for their crimes. However, Yanta admitted that his predecessor, Bishop Leroy T. Matthiesen, had recruited many of the problem priests out of treatment programs and kept that information secret from parishioners.

See also
 

 Catholic Church hierarchy
 Catholic Church in the United States
 Historical list of the Catholic bishops of the United States
 List of Catholic bishops of the United States
 Lists of patriarchs, archbishops, and bishops

References

External links
Roman Catholic Diocese of Amarillo Official Site

Episcopal succession

1931 births
2022 deaths
People from Karnes County, Texas
American people of Polish descent
20th-century Roman Catholic bishops in the United States
21st-century Roman Catholic bishops in the United States
Bishops appointed by Pope John Paul II
Roman Catholic bishops of Amarillo